Haapiti is an associated commune on the island of Mo'orea, in French Polynesia. It is part of the commune Moorea-Maiao. According to the 2017 census, it had grown to a population 4,254 people.

References

Populated places in the Society Islands
Mo'orea